Love Addict is the 14th studio album and second mandopop album by Hong Kong singer Prudence Liew.  This album marks the first Mandarin language studio album release from Liew since 愛自己 Love Yourself was released in Taiwan in 2000. This album is a cover album that consists entirely of songs that were originally sung by male singers.  This is the first in a series of three cover albums released by Liew in three different languages: the Cantonese album 偷 Stolen Moments came after in July 2012, and an English album titled Reincarnated Love released in July 2017.

Album information
The recording of this album was mixed in 24-bit with a sampling rate of 96 kHz.  It was then mastered in United States and the discs were compressed and made in Germany in Super Audio CD format.  Liew has stated that this is a true album for audiophiles.

Photography for this album was done by Hong Kong actor Chapman To, who is a photography enthusiast and a longtime fan of Liew.  To admitted that this is the first time he was hired as a paid professional photographer.

Release
The album was released on June 17, 2011, in Hong Kong.  HMV Hong Kong promoted the album with an offer of tickets to Liew's mini-concert with pre-orders of the album.

Upon its release, the album charted at number 2 in the HMV Hong Kong's Overall Sales Chart behind Lady Gaga's album Born This Way and topped both the Asian Sales Chart and Cantonese/Mandarin Sales Chart for two consecutive weeks.

Track listing
 認錯 (Apologize) originally sung by 優客李林 Ukulele in 1991
 他一定很愛你 (He Must Really Love You) originally sung by 阿杜 A-do in 2002
 你把我灌醉 (You Made Me Drunk) originally sung by 黃大煒 David Wong in 1994
 原來的我 (The Original Me) originally sung by 齊秦 Chyi Chin in 1988
 一場遊戲一場夢 (A Game, A Dream) originally sung by 王傑 Dave Wang in 1989
 走鋼索的人 (A Tightrope Walker) originally sung by 李泉 James Li in 1999　
 愛如潮水 (Love Like Tides) originally sung by 張信哲 Jeff Chang in 1993
 老實情歌 (Honest Love Song) originally sung by 庾澄慶 Harlem Yu in 1993
 其實你不懂我的心 (Actually, You Do Not Understand My Heart) originally sung by 童安格 Angus Tung in 1988
 何去何從 (Where to Come and Go) originally sung by 張國榮 Leslie Cheung in 1995

Chart history

Album

Singles (radio airplay)

Release history

References

2011 albums
Prudence Liew albums
Cinepoly Records albums
Covers albums
Jazz albums by Hong Kong artists